The following is a list of recorded songs by American rapper The Notorious B.I.G.

List 

Notorious B.I.G